The men's discus throw event at the 2010 Asian Games was held at the Aoti Main Stadium, Guangzhou, China on 24 November.

Schedule
All times are China Standard Time (UTC+08:00)

Records

Results 

 Ahmed Dheeb of Qatar originally won the silver medal, but was later disqualified after he tested positive for Testosterone.

References

Results

Athletics at the 2010 Asian Games
2010